Itzhak Nener (22 August 1919 - 27 April 2012) was an Israeli jurist who cofounded the International Association of Jewish Lawyers and Jurists and served as vice-president of Liberal International.

Biography 
Yitzhak Nener was born  in Vienna, Austria, and as an infant his family moved to the city of Stanisławów in Galicia, Poland, now Ivano-Frankivsk, Ukraine. In 1938, at the age of 19, he moved to Mandatory Palestine, making the journey on a ship with almost 1,000 Jewish students from all over Poland enrolled at the Hebrew University of Jerusalem.

He travelled on the ship with fellow student and Zionist activist, Blanca Stein; they married the following year, in 1939. Both of their families, who they had left behind in Poland perished in the Holocaust.

At the Hebrew University of Jerusalem, Nener studied social sciences, sociology, philosophy and history, and later law at the British Mandate High School of Law, writing one of the first academic publications on the Holocaust.

Political and public career
In 1960 Nener was elected to the Municipality of Jerusalem.

Nener was a member of the Liberal Party leadership and served as Vice President of Liberal International. According to former justice minister and deputy prime minister, Moshe Nissim, "He fought like a lion against anti-Israeli decisions."

Nener was the first Jew and Israeli to be elected honorary president of the World Jurist Association (WJA), and “was honored and held important positions in the organization" according to former president of the Supreme Court of Israel, Meir Shamgar. In 2005 at the global congress of WJA in Shanghai, China, Nener received a medal in honour of his contribution to peace and the rule of law.

Nener was one of the founders of the International Association of Jewish Lawyers and Jurists (IAJLJ), and served as Deputy President. In June 1998 at a conference of the IAJLJ in the  city of Thessaloniki in Greece, Nener cautioned that “the international revisionist movement, using the Internet and an orchestrated propaganda campaign, could warp the historical memory of younger generations;” and that "the denial movement has a historical institute which is reviewing history and whose real aim is to deny the Holocaust.”

In June 1999 in Berlin, Nener warned that “there are some very disturbing signs” of rising antisemitism in Germany and across Europe, but that “Germany is one of the few countries in Europe which has adopted legislation” to fight these trends.

Legal career
Nener was one of the founders of the Israel Bar Association and served as the first chairperson of the Jerusalem District Committee from 1965 to 1971, before being elected chairperson of the association's national council in 1972, a position he served in until 1987.

Itzhak Nener founded the law firm Nener Law Office in 1951 in Jerusalem, where he worked until his later years. The business operates to the present day as Nener & Co. Law Office & Notary, under the management of Itzhak's son, Adv. Yehoshua Nener.

Awards and recognition
In 2000, Nener was awarded the Yakir Yerushalayim annual citizenship prize.<ref name=Yakir>{{cite web|title= יקיר ירושלים בשנים עברו  תשס - 2000| trans-title = Yakir Yerushalayim past years - 2000|url=https://www.jerusalem.muni.il/city/yakir/yakirjer/notebook12654/Pages/Default.aspx|work=Municipality of Jerusalem|access-date=2018-10-16|language=he}}</ref> In September 2017, the Municipality of Jerusalem announced that a street in the city would be named after Itzhak Nener.

 References 

 External links 
  on Nener & Co.''

Israeli jurists
Israeli lawyers
Israeli Jews
Polish emigrants to Mandatory Palestine
Austrian emigrants to Poland
Hebrew University of Jerusalem alumni
1919 births
2012 deaths